During December 17–18, 2019, a series of demonstrations were held in the United States, in support of the impeachment of Donald Trump and his removal from the office of U.S. president. According to organizers MoveOn and Common Cause, more than 600 events were held. The rallies were called "Nobody Is Above the Law" and "Impeach and Remove", and December 17 was dubbed "Impeachment Eve", being held on the day before the House of Representatives' impeachment vote.

Tens of thousands of people participated in the protest. Stand Up America has also been credited as an organizer. The hashtags '#ImpeachAndRemove', '#ImpeachmentEve', and '#NotAboveTheLaw' trended on Twitter in the United States.

Locations

Listed below are the rallies

References

2019 in American politics
2019 protests
December 2019 events in the United States
Presidency of Donald Trump
Protests against Donald Trump